Valchi Dol (also transliterated Vǎlči Dol) is a town in northeastern Bulgaria, part of Varna Province. It is the administrative centre of Valchi Dol Municipality, which lies in the northwestern part of the Province. In December 2009 the town had 3,460 inhabitants.

Valchi Dol is located at the watershed of the Dobruja, Varna and Shumen plateaux. Its name means "wolf's ravine" in Bulgarian, which is also reflected in its old Ottoman Turkish name, Kurtdere. It was a village, until proclaimed a town in 1974. A diesel power plant was installed in 1929, the first in a village in Bulgaria.

References

External links

 Valchi Dol municipality website 

Towns in Bulgaria
Populated places in Varna Province